Golashkerd Rural District is a rural district (dehestan) in the Central District of Faryab County, Kerman Province, Iran. At the 2006 census, its population was 5,353, in 1,143 families. The rural district has 54 villages.

References 

Rural Districts of Kerman Province
Faryab County